Savino is a rural locality (a village) in Pyatovskoye Rural Settlement, Totemsky  District, Vologda Oblast, Russia. The population was 190 as of 2002. There are 3 streets.

Geography 
Savino is located 2 km southwest of Totma (the district's administrative centre) by road. Vydrino is the nearest rural locality.

References 

Rural localities in Totemsky District